Harold Franklin England (October 2, 1932 – November 6, 2003) was an American actor.

Personal life
He was born on October 2, 1932 to W. F. England and Della Irene England in Kings Mountain, North Carolina. He attended Kings Mountain High School and graduated with honors. After graduating from high school, he enrolled at Mars Hill Junior College to study for the ministry, but left a year later to study pre-law at the University of North Carolina at Chapel Hill. After a year of pre-law, he switched to dramatics and joined the campus theater group Carolina Playmakers. He graduated with a bachelor of arts degree in dramatic arts. He died on November 6, 2003 of heart failure at Providence Saint Joseph Medical Center. Fred W. Bennett, a producer, was his life partner for forty years.

Career
After graduating from university, England went to New York and starred in a number of off-Broadway productions, including Candide and The Seagull. He understudied Robert Morse  for two years in the Broadway production How to Succeed in Business Without Really Trying, and then starred in several Broadway productions including Love Me Little, Say Darling, and The Beggars Opera. He was a life member of the Actors Studio.

England also had over 100 guest starring roles in television, and appeared in over 200 TV commercials. He once had a lawsuit brought against him for $25,000 by Kentucky Fried Chicken, which he had completed a commercial for, for breach of contract, because he had also completed a commercial for their rival McDonald's; it was later settled out of court.

On November 5, 1970, he played the character warlock, Waldo, in the Bewitched episode, Samantha's Bad Day in Salem.

Filmography

References

External links
 
 

1932 births
2003 deaths
People from Kings Mountain, North Carolina
20th-century American male actors